伊達市 may refer to:
Date City, Fukushima
Date, Hokkaido